Brockie may refer to:

"Brockie", a nickname for Peter Brock
Bob Brockie
Dave Brockie, a performer who plays the character of Oderus Urungus in the heavy metal band GWAR
Dave Brockie Experience
Jenny Brockie, an Australian journalist and documentary-maker.
Jeremy Brockie, a New Zealand football (soccer) player.
Vince Brockie, Scottish footballer